Crystal Garden may refer to:

Crystal Garden (band)
Crystal Garden, a historic building in Victoria, British Columbia, Canada
Crystal Garden, a 2011 re-release of the 1973 Bola Sete album Goin' to Rio
Chemical garden